Xolane Shongwe is a South African cricketer. He made his List A debut for Easterns in the 2017–18 CSA Provincial One-Day Challenge on 15 October 2017.

References

External links
 

Year of birth missing (living people)
Living people
South African cricketers
Place of birth missing (living people)
Easterns cricketers